Tajiabad may refer to:
 Tajiabad-e Olya, Hamadan Province
 Tajiabad-e Sofla, Hamadan Province
 Tajiabad, South Khorasan